Arachnidiidae is a family of bryozoans belonging to the order Ctenostomatida.

Genera:
 Arachnidia Hincks, 1859
 Arachnidium Hincks, 1859
 Arachnoidea Moore, 1903
 Arachnoidella d'Hondt, 1983
 Arachnoidia Moore, 1903
 Cardoarachnidium Taylor, 1990
 Cryptoarachnidium Jebram, 1973
 Parachnoidea d'Hondt, 1979
 Pierrella Wilson & Taylor, 2012

References

Bryozoan families